David Fitzsimons  (23 April 1950 – 7 September 2008) was a former Australian Olympic athlete who competed in middle distance events and civil engineer.

A member of the Adelaide University Athletics Club, he represented Australia at two Olympic Games and two Commonwealth Games during his career. Inducted into the South Australian Athletics Hall of Fame in 2000. Fitzsimons won eight Australian Championships in Athletics over 5000 metres and 10000 metres including the 5k/10k double on three occasions.

Engineering
Fitzsimmons worked for 30 years at the Transport Department of the South Australian Government. He was the supervising engineer of a road bridge which replaced a level crossing on Park Terrace on what became the city ring route of Adelaide. The Park Terrace bridge over the Gawler railway line and interstate freight line is 120 metres long and was constructed in 1990. It was named after Fitzsimons in 2017.

Athletics career record
During his athletics career, Fitzsimons represented Australia at two Olympic Games, two Commonwealth Games and two World Cups.

His greatest international achievement was placing third over 5000 metres at the inaugural IAAF World Cup in 1977.

Statistics
Personal Bests

See also
 Australian athletics champions

References

1950 births
2008 deaths
Australian male middle-distance runners
Athletes (track and field) at the 1976 Summer Olympics
Athletes (track and field) at the 1980 Summer Olympics
Olympic athletes of Australia
Athletes (track and field) at the 1974 British Commonwealth Games
Athletes (track and field) at the 1978 Commonwealth Games
Commonwealth Games competitors for Australia
Australian civil engineers
Sportsmen from South Australia